Ronald Edward Blair (born September 16, 1948 in San Diego, California) is an American musician notable for being the bassist for Tom Petty and the Heartbreakers. He was originally the band's bassist from 1976 to 1981. In 2002, he returned to the group after a 20-year hiatus, replacing his own replacement, the late Howie Epstein.

Biography
Blair's father was a Navy man, so the family relocated every few years throughout the United States as well as within Japan and Hong Kong. As a teenager in Japan, Ron was in a locally famous rock band. But it was the music scenes in Macon, Georgia, and Gainesville, Florida, where Blair felt most at home. In Gainesville, Blair was a member of the band RGF. His sister is Janice Blair, a singer who was married to Gregg Allman from 1973 to 1975.

Career
Blair eventually moved to Los Angeles, and there teamed up with fellow Gainesville musicians Mike Campbell, Benmont Tench and Stan Lynch.  Campbell and Tench, along with Tom Petty, had been members of the popular Gainesville band Mudcrutch. Mudcrutch had relocated from Gainesville to Los Angeles, but subsequently broke up after failing to sign a recording contract. After the breakup, Tench recruited Campbell, Blair and Lynch to record demos in the hopes of getting a new record deal in Los Angeles. Meanwhile, Denny Cordell, president of Shelter Records, signed Tom Petty to his record label, after which Petty met up with his former bandmates and Floridians and asked if they would like to become his band. They agreed, and soon became known as the Heartbreakers. Blair was the oldest member of the band.

Blair went on to play with the band through its first four albums, Tom Petty and the Heartbreakers, You're Gonna Get It!, Damn the Torpedoes and Hard Promises. In the last couple of years of his first stint with the band, Blair was considering leaving and was not always available, thus being occasionally replaced with other bassists, including Donald "Duck" Dunn, on his last two albums. In spite of his departure in 1982, he would continue to make occasional guest appearances on studio albums all the way up to Southern Accents.

He rejoined the Heartbreakers on March 18, 2002, to perform at the band’s Rock and Roll Hall of Fame induction ceremony. The reunion led to Blair’s return to the group for its 2002 summer tour. He helped finish The Last DJ album and was present for all subsequent albums and tours following the death of his replacement Howie Epstein, creating a seamless transition.

Aside from the Heartbreakers, Blair has designed albums for Barbara Morrison and Carlos Zialcita. He has also played on albums by Kirstin Candy, Stevie Nicks, Del Shannon, Slobberbone and The Tremblers. Blair was also part of the original lineup of The Dirty Knobs, Mike Campbell's side-project band as well as Campbell's band the Blue Stingrays recording the album Surf-N-Burn in 1997.

Tom Petty said this about Blair: "It’s great having him [back] in the band. It reminds me of the old days just seeing him around. ... We hung out. We knew each other. And he was always the best bass player in town."

Blair has been seen with many basses (including a Rickenbacker 4001 and a Höfner Club bass, both owned by Petty), but is best known for playing Fender Jazz Basses, having used a black Jazz Bass in his early years with the Heartbreakers and a white Jazz Bass since his return to the band. His bass rig in the early days of the Heartbreakers was a Vox Super Beatle. When he returned to the band in 2002, and for the tours in 2002 and 2003, Blair was seen using a blond piggyback Fender Bassman amplifier. Since 2005, Blair's bass rig is a modern Ampeg SVT. In the 2010s, Blair was the producer behind two records by California band L.A. Edwards, including Blessings from Home Vol 1.

References

External links
Ron Blair Interview NAMM Oral History Library (2019)

American rock bass guitarists
American male bass guitarists
Tom Petty and the Heartbreakers members
Musicians from San Diego
1948 births
Living people
Musicians from Gainesville, Florida
Guitarists from Los Angeles
Guitarists from Florida
20th-century American guitarists